Baron Ponsonby, of Imokilly in County Cork, also referred to as Baron Ponsonby of Imokilly, in the County of Cork, was a title in the Peerage of the United Kingdom. It was created in 1806 for the William Ponsonby, who had previously represented Cork City, Bandonbridge and Kilkenny in the Irish House of Commons and Kilkenny in the British House of Commons. A member of the influential Ponsonby family, he was the eldest son of the Honourable John Ponsonby, second son of Brabazon Ponsonby, 1st Earl of Bessborough (see Earl of Bessborough for earlier history of the family). His son, the second Baron, was a prominent diplomat and notably served as Ambassador to the Ottoman Empire and Austria. In 1839 he was created Viscount Ponsonby, of Imokilly in the County of Cork, in the Peerage of the United Kingdom. He was childless and the viscountcy became extinct on his death in 1855. He was succeeded in the barony by his nephew, the third Baron. He was the posthumous son of the Honourable Sir William Ponsonby, second son of the first Baron. Lord Ponsonby died childless and was succeeded by his first cousin, the fourth Baron. He was the son of the Right Reverend the Honourable Richard Ponsonby, third son of the first Baron. He died unmarried in 1866 when the barony became extinct.

The aforementioned the Honourable Sir William Ponsonby, second son of the first Baron, was a Major-General in the British Army and was killed in action at the Battle of Waterloo. The aforementioned the Right Reverend the Honourable Richard Ponsonby, third son of the first Baron, was Bishop of Derry and Raphoe. The Hon. Mary Elizabeth, only daughter of the first Baron, was the wife of Prime Minister Charles Grey, 2nd Earl Grey. George Ponsonby, brother of the first Baron, was Lord Chancellor of Ireland.

Barons Ponsonby (1806)
William Ponsonby, 1st Baron Ponsonby (1744–1806)
John Ponsonby, 2nd Baron Ponsonby (c. 1770–1855, created Viscount Ponsonby in 1839)

Viscounts Ponsonby (1839)
John Ponsonby, 1st Viscount Ponsonby (c. 1770 – 1855)

Barons Ponsonby of Imokilly (1806; reverted)
William Ponsonby, 3rd Baron Ponsonby (1816–1861), nephew of the Viscount
William Ponsonby, 4th Baron Ponsonby (1807–1866), cousin of the preceding

Male-line family tree

See also
 Earl of Bessborough
 Baron de Mauley
 Baron Sysonby
 Baron Ponsonby of Shulbrede

References

Extinct baronies in the Peerage of the United Kingdom
Baron
Noble titles created in 1806
Noble titles created for UK MPs